Daniel Alan Stein (born 1955) is an American attorney, anti-immigration advocate, and the president of the Federation for American Immigration Reform (FAIR), which the Southern Poverty Law Center classifies as a hate group.

Early life and education 
Dan Stein was born in 1955 and is a native of Washington, D.C. He received his undergrad from the University of Indiana and attended the Columbus School of Law at the Catholic University of America where he received his J.D. Before working in immigration law, Stein worked in private practice.

Stein served as the Executive Director at The Immigration Reform Law Institute, a public interest litigation group that has represented a variety of organizations in immigration and administrative law matters.

FAIR 
Dan Stein joined the Federation for American Immigration reform in 1982 as FAIR’s Press Secretary. Stein became the executive director of FAIR in 1988, then took over as president in 2003. FAIR grew immensely under Stein's leadership, with the organization currently bolstering over 2 million members nationwide. While at FAIR, Stein has published hundreds of articles on immigration policy, and through the years has appeared on national television thousands of times on just about every significant news program in America, has spoken to major groups across America, and has been asked to testify before Congress on immigration-related issues over 50 times.

References

External links
 Federation for American Immigration Reform – official site
 ImmigrationReform.com – official site
 Citizens' Debate Commission – official site
 Immigration Reform Law Institute – official site
 Dan Stein Report – official site
 

1955 births
Living people
Indiana University Bloomington alumni
Columbus School of Law alumni
People from Washington, D.C.
People from Rockville, Maryland
Anti-immigration activists